JJA may refer to

Jazz Journalists Association
Kansas Juvenile Justice Authority
ICAO code of Jeju Air, which is the airline of Republic of Korea